The Starkville-Oktibbeha County Public Library System is a public library system serving Oktibbeha County, Mississippi. The library consists of three branches with the headquarters library, the Starkville Public Library, located in Starkville, Mississippi.

The library is part of the Mississippi Library Partnership, which is a consortium of public libraries in Mississippi which share their resources and catalog as a way to increase the amount of books available for their residents. The system currently uses SirsiDynix as their cataloging software. The name of this consortium was previously the Golden Triangle Regional Library Consortium before it was renamed in 2012 to better represent the region.

Branches

References

External links
Library homepage

Public libraries in Mississippi
Education in Oktibbeha County, Mississippi
Starkville, Mississippi